The River of Love is an album by American singer-songwriter Don McLean, released in 1995.

Track listing 
All songs by Don McLean.
"The River of Love"
"You're My Little Darlin'"
"If I Hadn't Met You"
"Better Still"
"You Got a Way About You, Baby"
"Angry Words"
"This Little Girl (Daddy-O)"
"Planet Noise"
"From a Beautiful Star"
"Little Cowboy"
"My Love was True"

References

River, The
1995 albums
Curb Records albums